The Huddersfield trolleybus system once served the market town of Huddersfield, in West Yorkshire, England.

By the standards of the various now-defunct trolleybus systems in the United Kingdom, the Huddersfield system was a medium-sized one, with a total of 15 routes and a maximum fleet of 140 trolleybuses.

A notable feature of the system was the Longwood trolleybus turntable, which was one of only four such turntables ever to have been constructed worldwide (one of two in the United Kingdom). The turntable was manually operated, and was in use only in 1939–1940 until wartime conditions forced the introduction of other arrangements. However, it remained in situ until demolished in the 1980s.

Three of the former Huddersfield trolleybuses are now preserved, at the Trolleybus Museum at Sandtoft, Lincolnshire.

History

The first conversion was the  Almondbury tramway. It was converted in sections with a temporary motor bus link as the road was resealed and electrified.

Six different 6-wheel buses were bought to trial on the route with Karrier, Ransomes and Sunbeam chassis and bodies by several builders. Most later buses were Karrier, though the local factory had closed.

The Almondbury route closed on 14 July 1965. The dates of the rest were:

In 1958 Edgar Dyson became general manager. The council then agreed to a closure programme, ending with 5 crowded Outlane buses on 13 July 1968. Rates paid to the county council were among reasons for early closure of the West Vale and Marsden routes.

See also

Transport in Huddersfield
List of trolleybus systems in the United Kingdom

References

Notes

Further reading

External links

Trolleybuses Galore! - Huddersfield trolleybuses fan site
National Trolleybus Archive
British Trolleybus Society, based in Reading
National Trolleybus Association, based in London
Huddersfield Examiner Trolleybus gallery

Transport in Huddersfield
Huddersfield
Huddersfield
1933 establishments in England
1968 disestablishments in England